Kuroshioturris is a genus of sea snails, marine gastropod mollusks in the family Turridae, the turrids.

Species
Species within the genus Kuroshioturris include:
 Kuroshioturris albogemmata Kuroda, Habe & Oyama, 1971
 Kuroshioturris angustata (Powell, 1940)
 Kuroshioturris hyugaensis (Shuto, 1961)
 Kuroshioturris kurodai (Makiyama, 1927)
 Kuroshioturris nipponica (Shuto, 1961)
 Kuroshioturris putere Beu, 2011 †

References

 Shuto T. (1961). Conacean gastropods from the Miyazaki Group (Paleontological study of the Miyazaki Group-IX). Memoirs of the Faculty of Science, Kyushu University, series D, Geology. 11(2): 71-150, pls 3-10

External links
 Bouchet P., Kantor Yu.I., Sysoev A. & Puillandre N. (2011) A new operational classification of the Conoidea. Journal of Molluscan Studies 77: 273-308
  Tucker, J.K. 2004 Catalog of recent and fossil turrids (Mollusca: Gastropoda). Zootaxa 682:1-1295